Mysterious Traveller is the fourth studio album by the jazz ensemble Weather Report and was released in 1974. This was their final recording with founding bassist Miroslav Vitouš, who left due to creative differences. Vitouš was replaced by Alphonso Johnson. Another addition to the line-up is drummer Ishmael Wilburn. Greg Errico was the drummer for the tour between the previously released Sweetnighter and this album, but declined an invitation to be a permanent member of the band.

The record is the band's first that predominantly uses electric bass and incorporates liberal uses of funk, R&B grooves, and rock that would later be hallmarked as the band's "signature" sound. Also, the more restricted compositional format became evident on this album, replacing the more "open improvisation" formats used on the first three albums. It was voted as the album of the year by the readers of DownBeat for 1974, garnering Weather Report's second overall win in that category, also garnering a five-star review from that publication along the way. The Penguin Guide to Jazz Recordings included the album in its suggested “core collection” of essential recordings.

The album peaked at number 2 in the Billboard Jazz Albums chart, number 31 in the R&B album chart, and number 46 in the Billboard 200.

Track listing

Personnel

Weather Report
Josef Zawinul - electric and acoustic piano, synthesizer, guitar, kalimba, organ, tamboura, clay drum, tack piano, melodica
Wayne Shorter - soprano & tenor saxophone, tack piano
Miroslav Vitouš - acoustic bass (tracks 2 and 8)
Alphonso Johnson - bass guitar
Ishmael Wilburn - drums
Skip Hadden - drums (tracks 1 and 4 only)
Dom Um Romão - percussions, drums
Guest musicians
Ray Barretto - percussion (track 3 only)
Muruga Booker - percussion (track 1 only)
Steve Little - timpani (track 6 only)
Don Ashworth - ocarinas & woodwinds (track 7 only)
Isacoff - tabla, finger cymbals (track 7 only)
Edna Wright - vocals (track 1 only)
Marti McCall - vocals (track 1 only)
Jessica Smith - vocals (track 1 only)
James Gilstrap - vocals (track 1 only)
Billie Barnum - vocals (track 1 only)
Technical
Ron Malo - sound engineer
Teresa Alfieri - cover design
Helmut K. Wimmer - cover artwork

Chart performance

References

External links
Weather Report Annotated Discography: Mysterious Traveller

1974 albums
Columbia Records albums
Weather Report albums